Whistling Shade is a literary journal based in St. Paul, Minnesota. Founded in 2001, the journal features fiction, poetry, memoir and essays on literary topics. Whistling Shade is semi-annual, and the print issue is distributed freely in cafes, book stores, and libraries in the Twin Cities area. Issues often have themes such as ghosts, mystery, song lyrics and bar stories.

According to the journal website, Whistling Shade takes “a populist approach to literature and our audience is the general reading public.” It is run by volunteers, has no academic backing and chooses not to apply for grants. Whistling Shade also publishes novels, short story and poetry collections by authors such as Jarda Cervenka, Sharon Chmielarz, Norita Dittberner-Jax and Jeff Vande Zande. It is financed by book sales, subscriptions and advertising. Poet Alan Morrison wrote of Whistling Shade: "it’s the sheer uncynical, approachable and didactic style of the articles which struck me, making for genuinely informative reading, on a variety of literary-related subjects, blissfully free of that consciously ‘ironic’ style of commentary that sadly informs much of UK journals."

Masthead 
 Publisher - Joel Van Valin
 Fiction Editors - Sten Johnson, Rock LaManna
 Poetry Editors - Julian Bernick, Ethna McKiernan
 Columnist - Justin Teerlinck

Noted past contributors 
 Fred Amram
 Marilyn Baszczynski
 Eric Stener Carlson
 Jarda Cervenka
 Sharon Chmielarz
 Philip Dacey
 Norita Dittberner-Jax
 Mike Finley
 Daniel Gabriel
 Margaret Hasse
 Mary Logue
 John-Ivan Palmer
 Joyce Sutphen
 Bryan Thao Worra
 Jeff Vande Zande
 Margaret Verble
 Hanakia Zedek

References

Further reading
 The Review Review - thereviewreview.net/magazines/whistling-shade
 MinnPost - https://www.minnpost.com/perspectives/2008/04/mnartistsorg-land-10000-lit-magazines
 Black Gate - https://www.blackgate.com/2015/11/23/magazine-spotlight-on-whistling-shade-the-horror-issue/

External links
 

2001 establishments in Minnesota
Biannual magazines published in the United States
Poetry magazines published in the United States
English-language magazines
Fiction magazines
Magazines established in 2001
Magazines published in Minnesota
Mass media in Minneapolis–Saint Paul